Kimiyo Hatanaka (born 16 April 1944), previously Kimiyo Yagahara, is a Japanese former professional tennis player.

A native of Tokyo, Hatanaka was the singles winner at the 1971 All Japan Tennis Championships and won a further six national titles during her career in women's doubles.

Hatanaka was a member of the Japan Federation Cup team during the 1970s, amassing wins in 11 singles and 12 doubles rubbers. She also represented Japan at the Asian Games and won six medals.

On the professional tour, Hatanaka competed in the main draw of all four grand slam tournaments.

Hatanaka runs the Big K tennis in Tokyo and has coached many Japanese professional players.

See also
List of Japan Fed Cup team representatives

References

External links
 
 
 

1944 births
Living people
Japanese female tennis players
Sportspeople from Tokyo
People from Suginami
Asian Games medalists in tennis
Asian Games gold medalists for Japan
Asian Games silver medalists for Japan
Asian Games bronze medalists for Japan
Medalists at the 1974 Asian Games
Medalists at the 1978 Asian Games
Tennis players at the 1974 Asian Games
Tennis players at the 1978 Asian Games
20th-century Japanese women
21st-century Japanese women